Pic de Freser is a mountain of Catalonia, Spain.

See also
Mountains of Catalonia

References

Mountains of Catalonia
Mountains of the Pyrenees